This is a list of Mozambican writers.

 Paulina Chiziane (1955– ), Portuguese-language novelist and short-story writer
 Mia Couto (1955– ), novelist and short story writer 
 José Craveirinha (1922–2003), Portuguese-language poet
 Luis Bernardo Honwana (1942– ), Portuguese-language short story writer
 Ungulani Ba Ka Khosa (1957– ), Portuguese-language novelist and short-story writer
 Fátima Langa (1953–2017), children's book author in Portuguese and various Bantu languages
 Lina Magaia (1940s–2011), Portuguese-language novelist and short-story writer
 Luis Bernardo Malangatana (1936– ), poet and autobiographical writer
 Orlando Marques de Almeida Mendes (1916–1990), Portuguese-language novelist
 Lília Momplé (1935– ), Portuguese-language fiction writer
 Eduardo Mondlane (1924–1969), politician and autobiographical writer
 Amélia Muge (1952– ), writer and singer
 Rui de Noronha (1909–1943), poet
 Glória de Santana (1925–2009), poet
 Marcelino dos Santos (1929–2020), poet
 Castro Soromenho (1910–1968), journalist, novelist and short story writer
 Noémia de Sousa (1926–2003), Portuguese-language poet

See also
List of African writers by country

References

Mozambican
Writers